Kerk Kim Hock (29 July 1956 – 9 August 2017) was a Malaysian politician who served as Member of Parliament (MP) for Kota Melaka from December 1999 to March 2004 and Pasir Panji from October 1990 to December 1999. He served as Member of the Malacca State Legislative Assembly for Durian Daun from August 1986 to October 1990. He also served as the 4th Secretary-General of the Democratic Action Party (DAP) from December 1999 to his retirement from politics in March 2004, DAP is a component party of the Pakatan Harapan (PH) opposition coalition. 

He was also a mechanical engineer by profession.

Political career
He was elected in 1986 as the state assemblyman for Durian Daun, Malacca. In 1987, he was detained for 60 days without trial under the Internal Security Act 1960 (ISA) as part of Operasi Lalang, a government sponsored crackdown that saw the arrest of many people, including activists, intellectuals and opposition politicians. In 1990 he was elected as a MP for Pasir Pinji, Perak but in 1995 he lost the Ipoh Timor parliamentary seat by a slim 292 vote majority. Kerk won the Kota Melaka, Malacca parliamentary seat in 1999 later but lost it in the 2004 general election by a slim 219 vote majority again. He then officially retired from Malaysian politics on 28 March 2004.

Personal life
Kerk was married to Mook Kwai Mei and the couple has two children; a son and a daughter. Kerk's son, Kerk Chee Yee has followed his footstep to join politics was elected as state assemblyman for the Ayer Keroh seat in the 2018 Malaysian general election (GE14). He served in the state executive council as Communications, Multimedia, NGO, Youth and Sports Committee chairman from 16 May 2018 until 2 March 2020 during the political crisis.

Health and death
He was diagnosed with Stage 1 rectal cancer in 2002. After 5 years of battle with cancer, he was announced cancer-free on 25 May 2007. But in 2015, he was diagnosed again with cancer.

Kerk died at 6.10 pm on 9 August 2017 at the age of 61 at his home in Taman Kenanga Seksyen 3, Melaka Tengah District of deep vein thrombosis (DVT) from surgery complications three days after slipping into a coma.

Election results

References

1956 births
2017 deaths
People from Malacca
Malaysian engineers
Democratic Action Party (Malaysia) politicians
Members of the Dewan Rakyat
Members of the Malacca State Legislative Assembly
Malaysian politicians of Chinese descent
Deaths from thrombosis